The Channel Highway is a regional highway that travels south from Hobart To Huonville, Tasmania, Australia. The Channel Highway starts from the end of Sandy Bay Road and travels south toward Huonville via Taroona, Kingston, Huntingfield, Margate, Kettering, Woodbridge and Cygnet. The shortest way from Hobart to Huonville is via the Huon Highway. Prior to the construction of the Southern Outlet the Channel Highway was the main route used to get to Kingston and other southern towns.

Kingston Bypass
In February 2010, the Tasmanian Government approved the construction of the 2.8 km Kingston Bypass. The bypass includes the Summerleas Road underpass, Algona Road roundabout and dedicated cycle lanes.

See also
 List of Highways in Hobart

References

Highways in Hobart
Southern Tasmania